The fifth USS Boston was a protected cruiser and one of the first steel warships of the "New Navy" of the 1880s.

Boston was laid down on 15 November 1883 by Delaware River Iron Ship Building and Engine Works, Chester, Pennsylvania, launched on 4 December 1884, and commissioned on 2 May 1887 at the New York Navy Yard, Captain Francis M. Ramsay in command.

Design and construction
All were ordered from the same shipyard, John Roach & Sons of Chester, Pennsylvania. However, when Secretary of the Navy William C. Whitney initially refused to accept Dolphin, claiming her design was defective, the Roach yard went bankrupt and Boston was completed at the New York Navy Yard, which had little experience with steel-hulled ships.

As-built armament included two /30 caliber Mark 1 guns, six /30 caliber Mark 2 guns, two 6-pounder guns, two 3-pounder Hotchkiss revolving cannon, two 1-pounder Hotchkiss revolving cannon, and two .45 caliber (11.4 mm) Gatling guns. The 8-inch guns were initially in open barbettes with gun shields added later.

Armor protection was light, with 2-inch (50.8 mm) gun shields and conning tower, and a 1.5-inch (38.1 mm) deck extending  over the machinery spaces.

The engineering plant included eight coal-fired cylindrical boilers producing  steam and a horizontal compound engine producing  driving one shaft. Like the other "ABCD" ships, Boston was built with a sail rig to increase cruising range, later removed.

Refits
In 1900–01 Boston was rebuilt and the 6-inch guns were converted to rapid firing with brass case ammunition replacing powder bags. During her service with the Oregon Naval Militia 1911-16 she retained her original pair of 8"/30 guns and three of the 6"/30 guns, with a single /40 caliber gun added. All armament was removed prior to her conversion to a freighter in 1917.

Service history

Boston, being the second cruiser of the New Navy completed, was not ready for active service until 1888. She then made a cruise to Guatemala and Haiti to protect American citizens. She joined the Squadron of Evolution on 30 September 1889 and cruised to the Mediterranean and South America from 7 December 1889 to 29 July 1890, and along the east coast in 1891. Boston departed New York on 24 October 1891 for the Pacific via Cape Horn, arriving at San Francisco on 2 May 1892. Except for a prospective Pacific Squadron commanding officer's cruise to the Hawaiian Islands from 11 August 1892 to 10 October 1893 (in which she provided a shore party in January 1893 that bolstered the overthrow of the Hawaiian monarchy), she remained on the West Coast until laid up at Mare Island Navy Yard on 4 November 1893.

Recommissioned on 15 November 1895, Boston joined the Asiatic Squadron at Yokohama, Japan on 25 February 1896. She remained in East Asia protecting American interests for the next four years and during the Spanish–American War took part in the Battle of Manila Bay on 1 May 1898 and the capture of Manila on 13 August 1898. From 4 October to 23 December, Boston and other ships deployed to Taku in China to protect American interests in the wake of a coup d'etat by the Empress Dowager Cixi. Following this, Boston remained in the Philippines assisting in their pacification until 8 June 1899. Sometime during this overseas deployment, Bostons distinctive sail rig was removed. This is evidence by a photograph taken in 1899 of Boston in the Philippines with pole masts but no cross rigging.

Boston returned to San Francisco on 9 August 1899 and went out of commission at Mare Island Navy Yard on 15 September 1899. She remained out of commission until 11 August 1902 and then rejoined the Pacific Squadron. On 7 November 1903, Boston was the first ship of the Pacific Squadron to arrive near Panama to support that country's newly declared independence; a key event in the creation of the Panama Canal. She then cruised in South America, Hawaii, and the US West Coast. From 16 to 25 June 1905, she helped represent the Navy at the Lewis and Clark Centennial Exposition at Portland, Oregon, and from 23 April – 10 May 1906 she helped care for the victims of the San Francisco earthquake and fire. In April 1907 she carried a Honduran peace delegation that ended the Honduran–Nicaraguan War. She went out of commission again at Puget Sound Navy Yard on 10 June 1907. From 15 June 1911 to September 1916, she served as a training vessel with the Oregon Naval Militia.

With the United States declaration of war on Germany in April 1917, Boston was loaned to the United States Shipping Board from 24 May 1917 – June 1918. Boston was converted to a freighter by Seattle Construction & Drydock in 1917–1918. Her guns were most likely removed when she was laid up at Bremerton between September 1916 and March 1917. On 18 June 1918, she was recommissioned at Mare Island Navy Yard as a receiving ship and towed to Yerba Buena Island, California, where she served as a receiving ship until 1940. She was renamed Despatch, the sixth U.S. Navy ship to bear that name, on 9 August 1940, thus freeing her original name for use on the new heavy cruiser .  From 1940 to October 1945, she was used as a radio school. The old ship was redesignated IX-2 on 17 February 1941. Despatch was towed to sea and sunk off San Francisco on 7 April 1946.

Legacy

Both of Bostons 8-inch (203-mm) guns were placed at the new Seattle Naval Hospital in 1942. After the hospital closed, the guns went with the site to the new Firlands Sanitarium owned by King County in 1947. At some point after 1952, the guns were moved to Hamlin Park, in Shoreline, Washington. However, county records do not indicate when the guns were placed in the park or why it was done. Of the two guns displayed at Hamlin Park, the easternmost gun bears a plaque which states that the gun fired the first shot of the Battle of Manila Bay.  The other bears a plaque crediting the gun with the dismounting of three guns at the Spanish fort of Cavite.

Awards
Boston/Despatch earned the following awards in her career spanning six decades:
 Battle of Manila Bay Commemorative Medal (a.k.a. Dewey Medal)
 Navy Expeditionary Medal (two awards)
 Spanish Campaign Medal
 Philippine Campaign Medal
 World War I Victory Medal
 American Defense Service Medal
 American Campaign Medal
 World War II Victory Medal

Notes

Bibliography
 
 Burr, Lawrence. US Cruisers 1883–1904: The Birth of the Steel Navy. Oxford: Osprey, 2008.  
 
 
 
 Rentfrow, James C. Home Squadron: The U.S. Navy on the North Atlantic Station. Annapolis, Maryland: Naval Institute Press, 2014.  
 Spears, John Randolph. A History of the United States Navy. New York: C. Scribner's Sons, 1908. 
 The White Squadron. Toledo, Ohio: Woolson Spice Co., 1891. 
 The White Squadron: Armed Cruisers, U.S.N. New York: International Art Publ. Co, 1800. 
 The White Squadron of the U S Navy. New York: James Clarke Publisher, 1894.

External links

 Naval History and Heritage Command: USS Boston (1887–1946) photos
USS Boston photo gallery at NavSource.org
USS Boston at SpanAmWar.com

1884 ships
Protected cruisers of the United States Navy
Auxiliary ships of the United States Navy
Ships built by the Delaware River Iron Ship Building and Engine Works
Spanish–American War cruisers of the United States
Philippine–American War ships of the United States
World War I auxiliary ships of the United States
World War II auxiliary ships of the United States
Scuttled vessels
Shipwrecks of the California coast
Maritime incidents in 1946